Pseudodreata is a genus of moths of the family Anthelidae. The genus was erected by George Thomas Bethune-Baker in 1904.

Species
 Pseudodreata aroa Bethune-Baker, 1904
 Pseudodreata strigata Bethune-Baker, 1904

References

Anthelidae